Nagendra Kumar Raya is a Nepalese politician. He was elected to the Pratinidhi Sabha in the 1999 election on behalf of the Nepali Congress.

References

Living people
Nepali Congress politicians from Madhesh Province
Nepal MPs 2017–2022
Nepal MPs 1999–2002
1954 births